The D.A. may refer to:

The D.A. (1971 TV series), an NBC TV series starring Robert Conrad and Harry Morgan
The D.A. (2004 TV series), an ABC TV series starring Steven Weber

See also
DA (disambiguation)